Road 53 is a road in central Iran connecting Shahrekord to Borujen.

References

External links 

 Iran road map on Young Journalists Club

Roads in Iran